, formerly , is a member of the all-female manga-creating team Clamp. She is the co-director and her duties in the team include applying screentones and correcting manga illustrations.  She was also the lead artist (a role that normally falls to Mokona) on Legal Drug, The One I Love, Wish, Suki and xxxHolic.   As the lead artist in xxxHolic, she is in charge of drawing the male characters while Mokona is responsible for the female characters.

For Clamp's 15th Anniversary in 2004, she and the other three members of Clamp changed their names because they reportedly wished to try new monikers.

References

Living people
Clamp (manga artists)
1969 births
Japanese women artists
Japanese female comics artists
Women manga artists
Manga artists from Kyoto Prefecture